David Gibson (1957) is a British street photographer and writer on photography. He was a member of the In-Public street photography collective.

Gibson's books include The Street Photographer's Manual (2014) and 100 Great Street Photographs (2017) / Street Photography: a History in 100 Iconic Images (2019). His photography has been published in a number of survey publications on street photography, and exhibited in group exhibitions in Britain (including at the Museum of London, which acquired his work for its permanent collection), at the Museum of the City of New York, and in France, Bangkok and Stockholm.

Life and work
Gibson was born in 1957 in Ilford, Essex, UK. He worked for several years as a care worker. His early published photographs were of the elderly, children and the disabled, in Community Care magazine.

He completed an MA in Photography: History and Culture at University of the Arts London in 2002. He was one of the earliest photographers to join the In-Public street photography collective, founded by Nick Turpin in 2000. As well as his street photography, Gibson also leads street photography workshops.

Publications

Books by Gibson
The Street Photographer's Manual. London: Thames & Hudson, 2014. . Includes profiles on David Solomons, Matt Stuart, Nils Jorgensen, Trent Parke, Jesse Marlow, David Solomons and Narelle Autio; also includes contributions from Paul Russell, Nick Turpin, Richard Bram, Andy Morley-Hall, Gus Powell, and others.
Street Photography: Manual de Fotografía de Calle. Blume, 2014. . Spanish-language version.
Street Photography: le Savoir Faire du Photographe de Rue. Dunod, 2014. . French-language version.
Manual do Fotógrafo de Rua. GG, 2015. . Portuguese-language version.
Street Photography: Manuale del Fotografo di Strada. Castello, 2016. . Italian-language version.
100 Great Street Photographs. Munich, London, New York: Prestel, 2017. Text by Gibson, photographs by various photographers. .
Street Photography: a History in 100 Iconic Images. Munich, London, New York: Prestel, 2019. .
Street Photography: die 100 besten Bilder. Munich, London, New York: Prestel, 2017. . German-language version.

Zines by Gibson
Subtitles for Life. London: Bump, 2020. Edited by David Solomons. Edition of 200 copies.

Publications with contributions by Gibson
Publication #1. London: Nick Turpin Publishing, 2009. Essays by Gibson, Hin Chua, Michael David Murphy and Nick Turpin. Photographs by Matt Stuart, Narelle Autio, Martin Kollar, Joel Meyerowitz, Tod Papageorge, Trent Parke and Garry Winogrand. Edition of 2000 copies.
10 – 10 Years of In-Public. London: Nick Turpin Publishing, 2010. . Includes an essay by Jonathan Glancey, "Outlandish Harmony"; a foreword by Nick Turpin; and a chapter each by Gibson, Stuart, Turpin, Richard Bram, Andy Morley-Hall, Trent Parke, Narelle Autio, Jesse Marlow, Adrian Fisk, Nils Jorgensen, Melanie Einzig, Jeffrey Ladd, Amani Willett, Gus Powell, Christophe Agou, Otto Snoek, Blake Andrews, David Solomons, George Kelly and Paul Russell.
Street Photography Now. London: Thames & Hudson, 2010.  (hardback). London: Thames & Hudson, 2011.  (paperback). Edited by Sophie Howarth and Stephen McLaren.
London Street Photography: 1860–2010. London: Museum of London; Stockport: Dewi Lewis, 2011. . Selected from the Museum of London collection by Mike Seaborne and Anna Sparham. Published to accompany an exhibition at the Museum of London.

Films
In-Sight (2011). 38 minute documentary directed and edited by Nick Turpin, commissioned by Format for Format International Photography Festival, Derby, 2011. Includes interviews with Gibson, Turpin, Solomons, Bram, Einzig, Gus Powell, Agou, Marlow and Snoek, and shows them at work.

Exhibitions with others or during festivals
Onto the Streets, Photofusion, London, 21 July – 16 September 2006, then toured with the British Council. Curated by Stephen McLaren and Sophie Howarth.
in-public @ 10, Photofusion, Brixton, London, 28 May – 9 July 2010. Travelled to Les Ballades Photographiques de Seyssel, Seyssel, France, 12–23 July 2011. Included photographs by various In-Public members.
Street Photography Now, Third Floor Gallery, Cardiff, 10 October – 14 November 2010. Photographs featured in the book Street Photography Now (2011).
Derby Museum and Art Gallery, Format International Photography Festival, Derby, UK, 4 March – 3 April 2011. Exhibition of photographs by various In-Public members, and the film In-Sight (2011).
London Street Photography: 1860-2010, Museum of London, London, 18 February – 4 September 2011. Included work by Gibson and others. Travelled to the Museum of the City of New York, 27 July – 2 December 2012.
Contemporary London Street Photography, London Festival of Photography, London, June–August 2012.
iN-PUBLiC: An Exhibition of Street Photography, Thailand Creative and Design Centre, Bangkok, Thailand, February–March 2013. In conjunction with the British Council. Photographs by various In-Public members.
In Public, Snickerbacken 7, Stockholm, Sweden, May–June 2013. Photographs by various In-Public members.
The Sharp Eye. In-Public in Mexico, Foto Mexico, Cine Tonalá, Mexico City, Mexico, October–November 2015. Slideshow of photographs by various In-Public members. Curated by Mark Powell, Carlos Álvarez Montero and Alfredo Esparza.

Collections
Gibson's work is held in the following permanent collection:
Museum of London, London.

Notes

References

External links

Gibson's profile at In-Public
Clip from In-Sight documentary with Gibson (video)

1957 births
Living people
Photographers from Essex
Street photographers
People from Ilford
21st-century British photographers